Geoff Taylor (born May 26, 1986) is a Filipino singer, model and actor. He was a former finalist of Pinoy Dream Academy: Season 1 before becoming the grand winner of the Are You the Next Big Star? together with Frencheska Farr as the female grand winner.

Early life and career
Taylor was born in Olongapo City. His father is of American descent while his mother is a pure Filipina. Before named as the Next Male Big Star of the talent search, Are You the Next Big Star?, he was one of the contestants of ABS-CBN's Pinoy Dream Academy: Season 1 where he was voted off early. Taylor was also a model from Cagayan Valley. After winning Are You the Next Big Star?, he started in various television guestings and shows together with his co-winner, Frencheska Farr. They guested at the christmaserye of GMA Network, Sana Ngayong Pasko. Taylor and Farr was also included in the recently concluded SOP Fully Charged and BandaOke wherein they were included in the BandaOke band along with Jay Perillo. In 2010, Taylor is currently seen in two GMA Network shows: the new musical variety show, Party Pilipinas and the newest season of Daisy Siete, Adam or Eve.

Filmography

Television

Awards and achievements

Singles
Hulog ng Langit – with Frencheska Farr (Langit sa Piling Mo Theme Song and Originally performed by Donna Cruz)

References

External links
 

1986 births
Filipino male models
21st-century Filipino male singers
Participants in Philippine reality television series
Star Magic
ABS-CBN personalities
Filipino people of American descent
Filipino Roman Catholics
Pinoy Dream Academy participants
Living people
Ilocano people
People from Olongapo
Singers from Zambales
GMA Network personalities
GMA Music artists